Kuta is a tourist area, administratively an urban village (kelurahan), and the capital of Kuta District, Badung Regency, southern Bali, Indonesia. A former fishing village, it was one of the first towns on Bali to see substantial tourist development, and as a beach resort remains one of Indonesia's major tourist destinations. It is known internationally for its long sandy beach, varied accommodation, many restaurants and bars, and many renowned surfers who visit from Australia. It is located near Bali's Ngurah Rai Airport.

The Balinese Provincial Government have taken the view that the preservation of the Balinese culture, natural resources and wildlife are of primary importance in the development of the island. To this end they have limited tourist development to the peninsula on the extreme southern aspect of the island; Kuta beach is on the western side of this peninsula and Sanur is on the east. To the north of the peninsula no new tourist development is supposedly permitted.

To the south, Kuta Beach extends beyond the airport into Jimbaran. Other nearby towns and villages include Seseh (6.4 nm), Denpasar (4.5 nm), Ujung (1.8 nm), Pesanggaran (2.0 nm), Kedonganan (2.9 nm), and Tuban (1.0 nm).

Administration

Badung Regency includes three districts with the name of Kuta:
 Kuta District (Kecamatan Kuta), which covers the villages of Kuta, Legian, Seminyak, Kedonganan, and Tuban. Kuta, Legian and Seminyak form a conurbation along the western side of the isthmus linking the Nusa Dua peninsula to the rest of Bali.
 South Kuta District (Kecamatan Kuta Selatan; includes Jimbaran and the whole of the Nusa Dua peninsula). 
 North Kuta District (Kecamatan Kuta Utara; includes villages of Kerobokan Kelod, Kerobokan, Kerobokan Kaja, Tibubeneng, Canggu, and Dalung).

Kuta is now the center of an extensive tourist-oriented urban area that merges into the neighboring towns. Legian, to the north, is the commercial hub of Kuta and the site of many restaurants and entertainment spots. Most of the area's big beachfront hotels are in the southern section of Tuban.

Legian and Seminyak are northern extensions of Kuta along Jl. Legian and Jl. Basangkasa. They are somewhat quieter suburbs with cottage-style accommodations, where many of the expat crowd live. Also to the north are Petitenget, Berawa, Canggu, and Seseh — new and quieter continuations of Kuta's beach. They are easy to reach through Abian Timbul or Denpasar and Kerobokan. Several large hotels are located in this area: the Oberoi Bali, Hard Rock Hotel Bali, the Intan Bali Village, the Legian Bali in Petitenget, the Dewata Beach, and the Bali Sani Suites in Berawa.

History

Bali bombing memorial

After the first Bali Bombing in 2002 at Kuta, which killed 202 people including 88 Australians, a permanent memorial was built on the site of the destroyed Paddy's Pub on Legian Street. (A new bar, named "Paddy's: Reloaded", was reopened further along Legian Street.) The memorial is made of intricately carved stone, set with a large marble plaque, which bears the names and nationalities of each of those killed. It is flanked by the national flags of the victims. The monument is well-maintained and illuminated at night.

The memorial was dedicated on 12 October 2004, the second anniversary of the attack. The dedication included a Balinese Hindu ceremony and the opportunity for mourners to lay flowers and other offerings. The Australian ambassador and Indonesian officials attended the ceremony as most of the victims were Australians.

Kuta Beach
The beach has been notable since the  early 1970s. Kuta beach is also known as Sunset Beach, as opposed to the Sunrise Beach, another name for Sanur Beach. Luxury resorts, restaurants, and clubs are located along the beach.

In 2011, a two-meter white sandstone fence, built in a Balinese architecture style, was built along the road to block the sand from blowing to the cafes and restaurants. The project cost Rp.4 billion ($0.47 million). Some tourists dislike it as it is considered to be blocking the beach view, while others believe the wall helps dampen the sounds from the congested traffic on the adjacent street.
To make the beach cleaner, as of late August 2011, vendors are prohibited from selling food on the beach, but they are still allowed to sell beverages and souvenirs.

The annual monsoon season in the region often results in trash and plastic waste washing up on the shore. Locals and tourists volunteer to clean the waste.

Tourism
Kuta is well known in Bali for being a cheap tourist destination for Australians due to its close proximity.

Popular Culture
Kuta is mentioned in "I've Been To Bali Too", the single by Australian folk-rock band Redgum from their 1984 album Frontline. It is also home to an Indonesian punk rock band Superman Is Dead, most famous for its English song "Kuta Rock City".

See also

 Jalan Legian
 Jimbaran
 New Kuta Beach
 Seminyak
 List of beaches in Indonesia

References

External links
 

Populated places in Bali
Tourism in Bali
Cultural Properties of Indonesia in Bali
Beaches of Bali
Badung Regency